Winnie the Pooh and Tigger Too is a 1974 American animated featurette based on the third chapter of Winnie-the-Pooh and the fourth and seventh chapters of The House at Pooh Corner by A. A. Milne. The featurette was directed by John Lounsbery, produced by Wolfgang Reitherman, released by Walt Disney Productions, and distributed by Buena Vista Distribution on December 20, 1974 as a double feature with the live-action feature film The Island at the Top of the World. It was nominated for an Academy Award for Best Animated Short Film, but lost to Closed Mondays.

Winnie the Pooh and Tigger Too was the third animated featurette in the Winnie the Pooh film series. The film's title is a play on the slogan "Tippecanoe and Tyler too" made famous during the 1840 United States presidential election.

It featured the voices of Sterling Holloway as Winnie the Pooh, Paul Winchell as Tigger, John Fiedler as Piglet, Timothy Turner as Christopher Robin, Dori Whitaker as Roo, Barbara Luddy as Kanga, Junius Matthews as Rabbit, and Sebastian Cabot as the narrator.

Plot
During the fall, Tigger has been bouncing on anyone he comes across for fun, including Pooh, Piglet, and Rabbit. Rabbit, who is gardening, is particularly angered. Meeting with Pooh and Piglet, he comes up with a plan: the three of them will take Tigger on a long walk in the forest, abandon him, and find him the next day, in the hopes that he will stop bouncing on his friends unexpectedly. Pooh, Piglet, and Rabbit execute the plan the next morning, and it initially appears to work, as they manage to lose Tigger, but things soon go wrong as they get lost and are unable to find their way home. Eventually, Pooh suggests following a sandpit in order to find their way out of the forest. In an attempt to prove Pooh wrong, Rabbit wanders away. Pooh and Piglet then fall asleep, but are awakened by the sound of Pooh's empty stomach rumbling. Pooh explains to Piglet that his twelve honeypots in his cupboard have been calling to his tummy from home, and that he couldn't hear them over Rabbit's voice. Pooh and Piglet then find their way out of the forest, but are immediately bounced by Tigger, causing them to realize that Rabbit's plan had failed. They mention to Tigger that Rabbit is still in the forest, and he ventures off to find him. By now, Rabbit is walking through the darkest part of the forest by himself. Scared by numerous noises such as a caterpillar eating a leaf and frogs croaking, Rabbit panics and tries to run away, only to be tackled by Tigger. Tigger explains to Rabbit that "Tiggers never get lost", and they return home, with Rabbit humiliated that his plan had failed.

Eventually, wintertime comes. One day, Roo wants to go play. His mother Kanga is unable to be with him, so she calls on Tigger to look after him as long as he comes back in time for his nap. Tigger gladly accepts. As they travel through the forest, Tigger and Roo see Rabbit ice skating. Tigger tries to teach Roo how to ice skate by doing it himself, but unfortunately, he loses his balance and collides with Rabbit while trying to regain it. As Rabbit crashes into his house, Tigger slides into a snowbank and decides that he does not like ice skating, before venturing further into the forest with Roo. Roo asks Tigger if he can climb trees, and Tigger says that that's what he does best, except that he bounces trees instead. With Roo riding on his back, Tigger bounces all the way to the top of a very tall tree, but when he sees how high up they are, he becomes paralyzed with fear and is afraid to climb back down. Tigger gets even more scared when Roo grabs his tail and uses it as a swing, making Tigger think Roo's "rocking the forest".

Meanwhile, Pooh and Piglet are investigating strange animal tracks that are actually Tigger and Roo's. When Pooh and Piglet hear Tigger howling for help and spotted him and Roo, they hide, mistaking him for a "Jagular". Roo calls out to Pooh and Piglet, alleviating their fears, and Tigger begs for someone to fetch Christopher Robin. Christopher Robin, Rabbit, and Kanga soon hear of Tigger and Roo's situation and rush to help. The gang use Christopher's coat as a net for Tigger and Roo to land in once they jump from the tree. Roo successfully jumps down, but Tigger, who is still too frightened to jump, makes up several excuses to not come down, one of them is that Tigger's tail would get tangled up in the tree branches. Rabbit then decides that the group will just have to leave Tigger in the tree forever, prompting Tigger to promise that he will never bounce again if he ever is released from his predicament. At this moment, the narrator chimes in for help. Tigger begs him to "narrate" him down from the tree, and he tilts the book sideways, allowing Tigger to step onto the text of the page. Tigger starts to feel better that he made it this far, but before he can do otherwise, the narrator tilts the book back the other way, causing Tigger to fall into the snow.

Overjoyed to be back on the ground, Tigger attempts to bounce, but Rabbit stops him, reminding him of the promise he made. Tigger's joy quickly turns to depression, and he slowly walks away. Rabbit feels better that there will be peace, but everyone else feels sad to see Tigger depressed and remind Rabbit of the joy Tigger had brought when he was bouncing. Realizing how selfish he was, Rabbit shows sympathy for Tigger and takes back the promise they had agreed on; Tigger overhears and gives Rabbit a friendly tackle. Tigger then invites everyone to bounce with him and even teaches Rabbit how to do it. For the first time, Rabbit is happy to be bouncing, as is everyone else, as Tigger sings his signature song once more before the short closes.

Voice cast

Paul Winchell as Tigger
Sterling Holloway as Winnie the Pooh
Junius Matthews as Rabbit
Barbara Luddy as Kanga
Dori Whitaker as Roo
John Fiedler as Piglet
Timothy Turner as Christopher Robin
Sebastian Cabot as Mr. Narrator

Awards
In 1975, Winnie the Pooh and Tigger Too won the Grammy Award for Best Album for Children. It was also nominated for the Academy Award for Best Animated Short Film.

Film release
The film was released on December 20, 1974 in the United States and December 27, 1974 in the United Kingdom, as a supplement to Disney's live-action feature The Island at the Top of the World. It would later be included as a segment in The Many Adventures of Winnie the Pooh, which included the two previous Pooh featurettes, released on March 11, 1977.

Like Winnie the Pooh and the Honey Tree, Winnie the Pooh and Tigger Too was also re-issued in theaters in North America. In the summer of 1978, Winnie the Pooh and Tigger Too was attached as a double-feature with The Cat from Outer Space.

Like both Winnie the Pooh and the Honey Tree and Winnie the Pooh and the Blustery Day, Winnie the Pooh and Tigger Too also had its network and world television premiere as a television special on NBC, on November 28, 1975. Along with the other 2 shorts, the premiere of Winnie the Pooh and Tigger Too was also sponsored by Sears, who was then the exclusive provider of Pooh merchandise.

Winnie the Pooh featurettes
 Winnie the Pooh and the Honey Tree (1966)
 Winnie the Pooh and the Blustery Day (1968)
 Winnie the Pooh and Tigger Too (1974)
 Winnie the Pooh and a Day for Eeyore (1983)

Sources

See also
 List of American films of 1974

External links

 
 

1970s English-language films
1974 short films
1974 animated films
1970s musical comedy films
1970s Disney animated short films
Short films with live action and animation
Musicals by the Sherman Brothers
Winnie-the-Pooh featurettes
Winnie the Pooh (franchise)
Animated films set in England
Animated musical films
Films scored by Buddy Baker (composer)
Films directed by John Lounsbery
Animated films about animals
American animated featurettes
1970s children's animated films
1974 comedy films
Films about toys